Njivice may refer to:

 Njivice, Montenegro, a village near Igalo
 Njivice, Croatia, a village near Omišalj
 Njivice, Radeče, a village in Slovenia